Juka is a blood soup from the Dzūkija region of southern Lithuania. It can be made using goose, duck, or chicken blood.

See also
 List of soups

References

Lithuanian cuisine
Blood soups